Latvia competed at the Summer Olympic Games for the first time at the 1924 Summer Olympics in Paris, France.

Athletics 

Ten athletes represented Latvia in 1924. It was the nation's debut appearance in the sport as well as the Games.

Ranks given are within the heat.

Boxing 

A single boxer represented Latvia at the 1924 Games. It was the nation's debut in the sport as well as the Olympics. Gutmans lost his only bout.

Cycling 

Four cyclists represented Latvia in 1924. It was the nation's debut in the sport as well as the Games.

Track cycling 

Ranks given are within the heat.

Football 

Latvia competed in the Olympic football tournament for the first time in 1924.

 Round 1 Bye

 Round 2

Final rank 9th place

Weightlifting

Wrestling

Greco-Roman

 Men's

References 
 Official Olympic Reports

Nations at the 1924 Summer Olympics
1924
Olympics